Marlena Cathorina Kruger is a South African-New Zealand medical researcher and academic. She is currently a full professor of nutritional physiology at the Massey University.

Academic career

After a 1986 PhD titled  'The effect of unsaturated fatty acids and related compounds on calcium transport in sarcoplasmic reticulum'  at the Medical University of Southern Africa, Kruger worked at the University of Texas at Austin and University of Pretoria before she moved to the Massey University in 2000, rising to full professor.

Kruger is active in Zontia and was a finalist in the 2017 Westpac Women of Influence Awards. In 2021 she received Massey University's Supervisor Research Medal. The Research Medals are Massey's highest honor.

Selected works 
 Kruger, M. C., H. Coetzer, R. De Winter, G. Gericke, and D. H. Van Papendorp. "Calcium, gamma-linolenic acid and eicosapentaenoic acid supplementation in senile osteoporosis." Aging Clinical and Experimental Research 10, no. 5 (1998): 385–394.
 Kruger, Marlena C., and David F. Horrobin. "Calcium metabolism, osteoporsis and essential fatty acids: A review." Progress in lipid research 36, no. 2-3 (1997): 131–151.
 Kruger, Marlena, John Wright, and Kuan Wang. "Nebulin as a length regulator of thin filaments of vertebrate skeletal muscles: correlation of thin filament length, nebulin size, and epitope profile." The Journal of Cell Biology 115, no. 1 (1991): 97–107.
 Kruger, Marlena C., Magdalena Coetzee, Marianne Haag, and H. Weiler. "Long-chain polyunsaturated fatty acids: selected mechanisms of action on bone." Progress in lipid research 49, no. 4 (2010): 438–449.

References

External links
  

Living people
New Zealand women academics
Academic staff of the Massey University
University of Texas at Austin faculty
Academic staff of the University of Pretoria
Sefako Makgatho Health Sciences University alumni
Year of birth missing (living people)
New Zealand women writers